Kentucky Route 151 (KY 151) is a  state highway in Kentucky. It runs from U.S. Route 127 (US 127) and US 127 Bypass (US 127 Byp.) northwest of Lawrenceburg to US 60 in rural Franklin County west of Frankfort.

Major intersections

References

0151
Kentucky Route 151
Kentucky Route 151